Cladycnis is a monotypic genus of  nursery web spiders containing the single species, Cladycnis insignis. It was first described by Eugène Louis Simon in 1898, and is only found on the Canary Islands.

See also
 List of Pisauridae species

References

Monotypic Araneomorphae genera
Pisauridae
Spiders of the Canary Islands